The 2007 FIVB Women's World Cup was held from 2 to 16 November 2007 in Japan.

Teams

12 teams participated in the World Cup:
 The host nation's team: 
 Two wild cards chosen from among the participants of the continental championships in 2007: ,

Squads

Venues

Format
The competition system of the 2007 World Cup is the single Round-Robin system. Each team plays once against each of the 11 remaining teams. Points are accumulated during the whole tournament, and the final ranking is determined by the total points gained.

Rounds 1 + 2 (30 matches, 5 days): 12 participating teams have been divided in 2 groups (Site A & Site B) 
Rounds 3 + 4 (36 matches, 6 days): teams have continued to play against the remaining teams of the other groups.

Results

|}

All times are Japan Standard Time (UTC+09:00).

First round

Site A

|}

Site B

|}

Second round

Site A

|}

Site B

|}

Third round

Site A

|}

Site B

|}

Fourth round

Site A

|}

Site B

|}

Final standing

Awards

 Most Valuable Player
  Simona Gioli
 Best Scorer
  Katarzyna Skowronska
 Best Spiker
  Nancy Carrillo
 Best Blocker
  Simona Gioli
 Best Server
  Yanelis Santos

 Best Libero
  Paola Cardullo
 Best Receiver
  Yuko Sano
 Best Digger
  Yuko Sano
 Best Setter
  Hélia Souza

External links
 Official website
 Match Info

2007 Women's
Women's World Cup
Women's World Cup
V
November 2007 sports events in Asia
Women's volleyball in Japan